Henri Kontinen and Édouard Roger-Vasselin were the defending champions, but chose not to participate.

Santiago González and Andrés Molteni won the title, defeating Aisam-ul-Haq Qureshi and Jean-Julien Rojer in the final, 6–2, 6–2.

Seeds

Draw

Draw

References
Main Draw

Stockholm Open - Doubles
Doubles